Sydney du Toit (4 July 1919 – 1 August 1999) was a South African cricketer. He played in twenty-six first-class matches for from 1946/47 to 1955/56.

References

External links
 

1919 births
1999 deaths
South African cricketers
Eastern Province cricketers
Gauteng cricketers
People from Parys